Ove Wisløff (born 20 April 1954) is a Norwegian former breaststroke swimmer. He competed in the 100 m and 200 m events at the 1976 Summer Olympics, and was eliminated in first rounds.

References

External links
 

1954 births
Living people
Norwegian male breaststroke swimmers
Olympic swimmers of Norway
Swimmers at the 1976 Summer Olympics
People from Alta, Norway
Sportspeople from Troms og Finnmark